Salvia coccinea, the blood sage, scarlet sage, Texas sage, or tropical sage, is a herbaceous perennial  in the family Lamiaceae that is widespread throughout the Southeastern United States, Mexico, Central America, the Caribbean, and northern South America (Colombia, Peru, and Brazil). At one time Brazil was considered to be where it originated, but its diploid chromosome count now points to Mexico as its place of origin.

Taxonomy
Its specific epithet, coccinea, means "scarlet-dyed" (Latin), referring to the color of its flowers.

Description
Flower color and size is quite variable. Flowers are pollinated by hummingbirds and butterflies.

Cultivation 
Salvia coccinea is an annual species. It is cultivated in urban green areas as well as in private gardens around the world. It has a long flowering period, from the start of summer to the end of autumn. Cultivated varieties include orange-red, pink, salmon, red, white, and scarlet, as well as bi-colored varieties. The plant is hardy to USDA Hardiness Zones Zones 8–10.

References

External links

Salvia coccinea in Native Plant Database at Lady Bird Johnson Wildflower Center
Salvia coccinea information page at University of Florida Extension

coccinea
Plants described in 1777
Butterfly food plants
Garden plants of North America
Flora of Brazil
Flora of the Caribbean
Flora of Central America
Flora of Colombia
Flora of Florida
Flora of Mexico
Flora of Peru
Flora of Texas
Flora of the Southeastern United States
Flora without expected TNC conservation status